Avon is a former New Zealand parliamentary electorate. It was created for the 1861 general election and existed until 1996. It was represented by 13 Members of Parliament and was held by Independents, Liberal Party or Labour Party representatives.

Population centres
The electorate was in Christchurch, New Zealand, named after the Avon River. For the 1887 by-election, polling booths were in Riccarton and Papanui. For the 1887 general election, polling booths were in Papanui, Bright's Road, Spreydon and New Brighton.

History
The electorate was created in 1861, and existed continuously until 1996, when with MMP it was absorbed into the new Christchurch East electorate.

Alfred Richard Creyke stood in the 1861 general election (held on 1 February) in the Avon electorate for Parliament, whilst William Thomson stood in the same electorate for the Canterbury Provincial Council. Thomson proposed Creyke and vice versa; both were elected unopposed. Creyke thus became the first representative.  Creyke resigned from Parliament on 21 April 1862.

Creyke was succeeded by William Thomson, who was elected in the 11 June  and took his oath on 30 July 1862. He retired on 27 January 1866. Thomson was succeeded by Crosbie Ward, who won the  against Charles Wellington Bishop (brother of Edward Bishop). Ward resigned in the following year.

William Reeves won the resulting  by-election. He resigned in the following year. William Rolleston represented the electorate from the resulting  by-election (elected unopposed) to 1884. In the 1879 general election, he was returned unopposed.

Rolleston was succeeded by Leonard Harper in the Avon electorate. Harper resigned on 3 May 1887, and the resulting by-election was contested by Edwin Blake and William Dunlop, who received 255 and 252 votes, respectively. The 1887 general election was contested  by Edwin Blake and E. G. Wright. Blake won the election by a good margin. At the end of the parliamentary term in 1893, Blake retired from politics.

In the previous Parliament, he had represented the  electorate. Russell and McCombs polled 3,040 and 2,817 votes, respectively, and proceeded to the second ballot. Russell won the second ballot with 3,854 to 3,583 votes. Sullivan was successful at the next eight subsequent elections. Sullivan died in office on 8 April 1947.

He was a cabinet minister from 1957 to 1960 in the Second Labour Government and retired from Parliament in 1972.

Mathison was succeeded by Mary Batchelor, who represented the electorate for five parliamentary terms. He served the electorate until its abolition in 1996.

Members of Parliament
Key

Election results

1993 election

1990 election

1987 election

1984 election

1981 election

1978 election

1975 election

1972 election

1969 election

1966 election

1963 election

1960 election

1957 election

1954 election

1951 election

1949 election

1947 by-election

Robertson was a member of the Democratic Labour Party (DLP) but his nomination was refused endorsement by DLP leader John A. Lee.

1946 election

1943 election

1935 election

1931 election

1928 election

1925 election

1922 election

1919 election

1914 election

1911 election

1908 election

1899 election

1896 election

1893 election

1890 election

1866 election

Notes

References

1860 establishments in New Zealand
1996 disestablishments in New Zealand
Historical electorates of New Zealand